Abu Musa is a  island in the eastern Persian Gulf near the entrance to the Strait of Hormuz. Due to the depth of sea, oil tankers and big ships have to pass between Abu Musa and Greater and Lesser Tunbs; this makes these islands some of the most strategic points in the Persian Gulf. The island is administered by Iran as part of its province of Hormozgan, but is also claimed by the United Arab Emirates as a territory of the emirate of Sharjah.

Name 
Iranian Abu Musa's inhabitants call it "Gap-sabzu", which in Persian means "the great green place." On old Persian maps, the island is called:
 "Boum-Ouw" or "Boum-Ouf" which in Persian means "Waterland".
 "Boum-Souz" or "Boum-Sou"/"Boum-Souw" or "Gap-Sabzou" which in Persian means "Green Land".

However, in recent centuries it has also been called Bum Musa, Persian for "the land of Musa/Moses," instead of "Boum-Sou".

In Arabic sources, "Abu Musa" comes from Abu Musa al-Ash'ari, a companion of Prophet Muhammad, who stayed on the island in 643 A.D before battling the Persians.

Geography 
Out of 14 islands of Hormozgan it is the island farthest from the Iranian coast. Its highest point is the  Mount Halva. Abu Musa city is the center of the island. The weather in Abu Musa is warm and humid, although, compared to the place in the Persian Gulf, Abu Musa has a better climate and the most diverse ecosystem, but it lacks suitable soil and water for farming leaving fishing as the main industry for locals. 

It is served by the regional Abu Musa Airport.

History 

The sovereignty of Iran on Abu Musa has been disputed by UAE, which inherited the dispute in 1971. By common consent, the island had been under the control of the Al-Qasimi ruler of Sharjah. In 1906 Salim bin Sultan, the uncle of Sharjah's ruler Saqr bin Khalid, awarded a concession for the iron oxide deposits of Abu Musa to three Arabs, whose workers extracted the mineral and agreed to sell it to Wonckhaus, a German enterprise. However, when Saqr bin Khalid discovered this, he cancelled the concession and the workers were removed from the island with assistance from the British, resulting in an international incident.

After 1908, the UK controlled the island along with the other British-held islands in the Persian Gulf, including what is today the UAE. In the late 1960s, the UK transferred administration of the island to the British-appointed Sharjah, one of the seven sheikdoms that would later form the UAE.

After the UK announced in 1968 that it would end its administrative and military positions in the Persian Gulf, Iran moved to reattach the island politically to the mainland. On 30 November 1971 (two days before the official establishment of UAE), Iran and Sharjah signed a Memorandum of Understanding. They agreed to allow Sharjah to have a local police station and Iran to station troops on the island according to the map attached to the Memorandum of Understanding. The agreement also divided the island's energy resources between the two signatories. "By agreeing to the pact, the tiny emirate prevented an invasion by Iran, which two days earlier had taken two other disputed islands, the Greater and Lesser Tunbs, which were even smaller and uninhabited."

Iranian takeover
On 30 November 1971, a day before the UK officially left the region, Iran moved troops onto the island and was officially welcomed by the Sheik of Sharjah's brother, Sheik Saqer.

UAE claim
The UAE took its sovereignty claim over Abu Musa and the two Tunb islands to a meeting of the United Nations Security Council of 9 December 1971. At that meeting, it was decided to "defer consideration of this matter to a later date". Iraq (Ahmed Hassan al-Bakr era), Kuwait, Algeria, South Yemen and Libya held the view that the territory rightfully belongs to the UAE. Since that time, the UAE has consistently called in public statements for either bilateral negotiations or by referring the issue to the International Court of Justice (or another form of international arbitration).

Saddam Hussein attempted to justify the Iran–Iraq War by claiming that one of the objectives was to "liberate" Abu Musa and the Tunbs in the Persian Gulf. In 1992, Iran expelled “foreign” workers who operated the UAE-sponsored school, medical clinic, and power-generating station. The dispute has also caused serious friction between Ras al-Khaimah and Sharjah on the one hand and some other emirates of the UAE on the other. Ras Al Khaimah advocates tough measures against Iran. Dubai, on the other hand, believes that the conflict is unnecessary. The present ruler of Dubai (who is also Vice President, Prime Minister and Defence Minister of the UAE), Mohammed bin Rashid Al Maktoum, has earlier stated publicly that "he believes the tensions over the islands have been fabricated by the United States".

In 2012 a visit to the island by Iranian president Ahmedinejad provoked a diplomatic incident. Iran's historical claim to ownership over the islands roots back to the Parthian and Sasanian Empires, among others. Iran considers the island to have been occupied by the UK and refers to the agreement between Iran and the emirate of Sharjah in 1971.

Demographics 
, the island had about 2,131 inhabitants, making it Iran's smallest county. The city of Abu Musa had 1,953 inhabitants in 2012, up 248 from 2006.

Most of the residents of the island speak the "Bandari" dialect of Persian.

Native UAE citizens living on the island allegedly face “great difficulties” with the lack of proper clinics and schools. Only one school exists on the island, and it is used by 150 students. Moreover, patients have to be transported to Sharjah to receive treatment, but that is sometimes not feasible because of the Iranian authorities. In addition, Iran allegedly delays or blocks UAE's school and medical supplies from entering the island.

Climate

See also 

 Iran–United Arab Emirates relations
 Seizure of Abu Musa and the Greater and Lesser Tunbs
 Sir Abu Nu'ayr
 List of lighthouses in Iran

References

Sources 
 Haghshenas, Seyeed Ali, Iran Historical Sovereignty over the Tunbs and BuMusa Islands. 2010, Tehran.

Further reading

External links 

 
 History, description, map of Abu Musa and nearby islands (Archived 2009-10-24)
 History of Abu Musa and The Tunbs
 UAE Interact Abu Musa News
 Abu Musa's military garrison
 Dispute between Iran and Sharjah
 Report of the International symposium on Modern Boundaries of Iran – Problems and practices of Iranian boundaries, Pirouz Mojtahed-Zadeh, 10/15/02
 Picture of Abu Musa Lighthouse

Abumusa County
Disputed islands
Disputed territories in the Persian Gulf
Islands of Iran
Islands of the Persian Gulf
Territorial disputes of Iran
Territorial disputes of the United Arab Emirates
Lighthouses in Iran